In the field of cell biology, TNF-related apoptosis-inducing ligand (TRAIL), is a protein functioning as a ligand that induces the process of cell death called apoptosis.

TRAIL is a cytokine that is produced and secreted by most normal tissue cells. It causes apoptosis primarily in tumor cells, by binding to certain death receptors. TRAIL and its receptors have been used as the targets of several anti-cancer therapeutics since the mid-1990s, such as Mapatumumab. However, as of 2013, these have not shown significant survival benefit. TRAIL has also been implicated as a pathogenic or protective factor in various pulmonary diseases, particularly pulmonary arterial hypertension.

TRAIL has also  been designated CD253 (cluster of differentiation 253) and TNFSF10 (tumor necrosis factor (ligand) superfamily, member 10).

Gene 

In humans, the gene that encodes TRAIL is located at chromosome 3q26, which is not close to other TNF family members. The genomic structure of the TRAIL gene spans approximately 20 kb and is composed of five exonic segments 222, 138, 42, 106, and 1245 nucleotides and four introns of approximately 8.2, 3.2, 2.3 and 2.3 kb.

The TRAIL gene lacks TATA and CAAT boxes and the promoter region contains putative response elements for transcription factors GATA, AP-1, C/EBP, SP-1, OCT-1, AP3, PEA3, CF-1, and ISRE.

The TRAIL gene as a drug target
TIC10 (which causes expression of TRAIL) was investigated in mice with various tumour types.

Small molecule ONC201 causes expression of TRAIL which kills some cancer cells.

Structure 

TRAIL shows homology to other members of the tumor necrosis factor superfamily. It is composed of 281 amino acids and has characteristics of a type II transmembrane protein. The N-terminal cytoplasmic domain is not conserved across family members, however, the C-terminal extracellular domain is conserved and can be proteolytically cleaved from the cell surface. TRAIL forms a homotrimer that binds three receptor molecules.

Function 

TRAIL binds to the death receptors DR4 (TRAIL-RI) and DR5 (TRAIL-RII). The process of apoptosis is caspase-8-dependent. Caspase-8 activates downstream effector caspases including procaspase-3, -6, and -7, leading to activation of specific kinases. TRAIL also binds the receptors DcR1 and DcR2, which do not contain a cytoplasmic domain (DcR1) or contain a truncated death domain (DcR2). DcR1 functions as a TRAIL-neutralizing decoy-receptor. The cytoplasmic domain of DcR2 is functional and activates NFkappaB.
In cells expressing DcR2, TRAIL binding therefore activates NFkappaB, leading to transcription of genes known to antagonize the death signaling pathway and/or to promote inflammation. Application of engineered ligands that have variable affinity for different death (DR4 and DR5) and decoy receptors (DCR1 and DCR2) may allow selective targeting of cancer cells by controlling activation of Type 1/Type 2 pathways of cell death and single cell fluctuations. Luminescent iridium complex-peptide hybrids, which mimic TRAIL, have recently been synthesized in vitro. These artificial TRAIL mimics bind to DR4/DR5 on cancer cells and induce cell death via both apoptosis and necrosis, which makes them a potential candidate for anticancer drug development.

The TRAIL receptors as a drug target

In clinical trials only a small proportion of cancer patients responded to various drugs that targeted TRAIL death receptors. Many cancer cell lines develop resistance to TRAIL and limits the efficacy of TRAIL-based therapies.

Interactions 

TRAIL has been shown to interact with TNFRSF10B.

See also 
 The Proteolysis Map

References

Further reading

External links 
 Apoptosis, Trail & Caspase 8 - The Proteolysis Map-animation
 
 
 

Cell biology
Clusters of differentiation